Vic Hershkowitz (5 October 1918 – 23 June 2008) was a dominant handball player who played from the early 1940s to the early 1960s. He won 23 amateur national titles. He was a New York City fireman.  His accomplishments include winning forty national and international handball titles, including nine consecutive Three-Wall Singles Championships. He died 23 June 2008 in Plantation, Florida.

References

1918 births
2008 deaths
American male handball players
People from Brooklyn
Deaths from lung disease